The State Arsenal, originally the Providence Marine Corps of Artillery Arsenal, and commonly called the Benefit Street Arsenal is a historic armory building located at 176 Benefit Street in the College Hill neighborhood of Providence, Rhode Island.  It was built in 1829, was designed by Russell Warren in the Gothic Revival style, and was built by Tallman & Bucklin.

The building was added to the National Register of Historic Places in 1970.

History
The arsenal was designed in 1839 by Russell Warren and built by Tallman & Bucklin, all of Providence.

In the 19th century the arsenal was used as the armory of the Providence Marine Corps of Artillery (PMCA) and associated artillery units in the Rhode Island Militia and was used as the mobilization site for 10 batteries of light artillery which were raised in Rhode Island during the American Civil War. In addition to the PMCA the arsenal was used by a number of organizations including the Grand Army of the Republic, Sons of Union Veterans of the Civil War and United Spanish War Veterans.

The building originally sat one lot south of its current location, where its parking lot is today, but was moved in 1906 when a railroad tunnel was built under that site.

In April 1920, the Rhode Island General Assembly earmarked $3,800 for the purpose of repairing the arsenal.

On May 17, 1924, the Ku Klux Klan held an illegal meeting at the arsenal which attracted about 200 men. Governor William S. Flynn denounced the KKK and forbade the group from meeting on state property.

The building was added to the National Register of Historic Places on April 28, 1970.

In the 1980s the arsenal was in use by the Rhode Island National Guard's Education, Historical and Equal Opportunity offices.

As of 2008 the arsenal was in use as the location for the annual presentation of the Order of St. Barbara to soldiers of the 103d Field Artillery Regiment of the Rhode Island National Guard. It also serves as the headquarters of the PMCA (the de facto 103d Field Artillery veterans association) and houses a diverse collection of military artifacts.

Gallery

See also
National Register of Historic Places listings in Providence, Rhode Island

References

External links

Government buildings completed in 1839
Infrastructure completed in 1839
Military facilities on the National Register of Historic Places in Rhode Island
Russell Warren buildings
Buildings and structures in Providence, Rhode Island
National Register of Historic Places in Providence, Rhode Island